Karsten Magnus Konow (16 February 1918 – 10 July 1945 in Stavanger) was a Norwegian sailor who competed in the 1936 Summer Olympics.

In 1936 he won the silver medal as crew member of the Norwegian boat Lully II in the 6 metre class event. His father Magnus Konow was captain.

External links
profile

1918 births
1945 deaths
Norwegian male sailors (sport)
Olympic sailors of Norway
Sailors at the 1936 Summer Olympics – 6 Metre
Olympic silver medalists for Norway
Olympic medalists in sailing

Medalists at the 1936 Summer Olympics